Drasteria sabulosa is a moth of the family Erebidae. It is found from British Columbia south into the United States where it found as far east as Wyoming, Utah, Colorado, New Mexico and as far south as Arizona.

The wingspan is 33–37 mm.

References

External links

Drasteria
Moths described in 1881
Moths of North America